Qatar utilized a different national anthem from 1954 through 1996. Written like a typical Arab fanfare, this national anthem is possibly the shortest national anthem (in terms of music) to ever exist, with only 11 measures.  It also has no lyrics. Its music is possibly of an Indian origin.

References

Qatari music
Asian anthems
National anthems
Historical national anthems